Ram Man Shrestha "Trishit" (c. 194131 May 2011) was a highly reputed lyricist of Nepali songs.

He was a medical doctor by profession. He wrote many lyrics, most of which were turned into music by Shiva Shankar and sung by Tara Devi. The friendship between Ram Man and Shiva Shankar lasted until the death of Shiva Shankar. These two grand maestros of modern Nepalese music worked together and inspired each other that resulted in several masterpieces. Nati kaji and Gopal Yonjan also composed music for some of his songs.

Death
He died in Chabahil on 31 May 2011, aged 70.

Notable songs
""—Tara Devi (singer)""—Nirmala Shrestha""—Tara Devi""—Narayan Gopal/Gyanu Rana""—Dhruba KC""—CP Lohani""—Prem Dhoj""—Tara Devi""—Narayan Gopal""—Udit Narayan

References

External links
 Nepalicollections.com - Ram Man Trashit Songs

20th-century Nepalese male singers
1940s births
2011 deaths
Deaths from kidney disease
Date of birth missing
Place of birth missing
Nepalese songwriters
Lyric poets